Butler County is a county in the Commonwealth of Pennsylvania. It is part of Western Pennsylvania. As of the 2020 census, the population was 193,763. Its county seat is Butler. Butler County was created on March 12, 1800, from part of Allegheny County and named in honor of General Richard Butler, a hero of the American Revolution.

Butler County is part of the Pittsburgh, PA Metropolitan Statistical Area.

History
Some famous inventions and discoveries were made in Butler County.  Saxonburg was founded as a Prussian colony by John A. Roebling, a civil engineer, and his brother Carl. After farming for a time, Roebling returned to engineering, and invented his revolutionary "wire rope.", which he first produced at Saxonburg. He moved the operation to Trenton, New Jersey. He is best known for designing his most famous work, the Brooklyn Bridge, but designed and built numerous bridges in Pittsburgh and other cities as well.

At what is now known as Oil Creek, Butler County resident William Smith and Edwin Drake first proved oil could be tapped from underground for consistent supply. The Jeep was developed in Butler County by American Bantam in 1941.

Famous politicians have lived in and traveled through Butler County. U.S. Senator Walter Lowrie, the only senator from Butler, built a home in 1828 that still stands behind the Butler County Courthouse. The house has been adapted for use by the Butler County Historical Society. Butler's highest-ranked federal official is William J. Perry, Secretary of Defense under President Bill Clinton from 1994 to 1997. He graduated from Butler High School in 1945.

George Washington passed through this area during the French and Indian War. In 1923, the funeral train of President Warren G. Harding passed through Butler County on its way to Washington D.C. John F. Kennedy spoke in front of the Butler County Courthouse during the 1960 United States presidential election. Hubert Humphrey also campaigned in Butler. In 2004, Vice President Dick Cheney spoke in Saxonburg to campaign for President George W. Bush in the 2004 United States presidential election.

Bret Michaels, lead singer of the rock band Poison, was born here in 1963.

Geography

It is the location of Moraine State Park, with the  glacial lake, Lake Arthur. Lake Arthur is used for fishing and sailing, and the surrounding park is used for hiking and hunting.

The county has a humid continental climate (Dfa/Dfb) and average monthly temperatures in Butler borough range from 27.7 °F in January to 72.1 °F in July.

Waterways
 Allegheny River (The river touches Butler County at its northeast and southeast corners.  It is both a recreational and industrial waterway.)
 Connoquenessing Creek (recreational canoeing and kayaking)
 Lake Arthur at Moraine State Park (recreational boating, canoeing and kayaking)
 Slippery Rock Creek (recreational canoeing and kayaking)
 Little Connoquenessing Creek
 Bull Creek
 Muddy Creek
 Sullivan Run
 Semiconon Run
 Mulligan Run

Adjacent counties
Venango County (north)
Clarion County (northeast)
Armstrong County (east)
Westmoreland County (southeast)
Allegheny County (south)
Beaver County (southwest)
Lawrence County (west)
Mercer County (northwest)

Demographics

As of the census of 2000, there were 174,083 people, 65,862 households, and 46,827 families residing in the county.  The population density was 221 people per square mile (85/km2).  There were 69,868 housing units at an average density of 89 per square mile (34/km2).  The racial/ethnic makeup of the county is 96.5% White, 0.9% Black or African American, 0.09% Native American, 0.8% Asian, 0.03% Pacific Islander, 0.17% from other races, 0.7% from two or more races; and 0.9% Hispanic or Latino of any race. 46.7% German, 24.8% Irish, 15.2% Italian, 9.9% English, 9.2% Polish, 6.3% American, 3.7% Scotch-Irish, and 3.1% French ancestry.

There were 65,862 households, out of which 32.90% had children under the age of 18 living with them, 59.80% were married couples living together, 8.10% had a female householder with no husband present, and 28.90% were non-families. 24.20% of all households were made up of individuals, and 10.40% had someone living alone who was 65 years of age or older.  The average household size was 2.55 and the average family size was 3.04.

In the county, the population was spread out, with 24.60% under the age of 18, 8.80% from 18 to 24, 29.40% from 25 to 44, 23.00% from 45 to 64, and 14.30% who were 65 years of age or older.  The median age was 38 years. For every 100 females, there were 95.40 males.  For every 100 females age 18 and over, there were 91.80 males.

2020 Census

Law and government

|}

Elected county officials

 Commissioner Leslie Osche (chairman), Republican
 Commissioner Kim Geyer, Republican
 Commissioner Kevin Boozel, Democratic
 District Attorney: Richard Goldinger, Republican
 Controller: Ben Holland, Republican
 Treasurer: Diane Marburger, Republican
 Prothonotary: Kelly Ferrari, Republican
 Clerk of Courts: Lisa Lotz, Republican
 Sheriff: Michael Slupe, Republican
 Recorder of Deeds: Michele Mustello, Republican
 Register of Wills: Sara Edwards, Republican

County judges
Dr. S. Michael Yeager(President Judge)
Timothy McCune
Kelly Streib
Joseph Kubit
William Shaffer(Senior Judge)
William Robinson, Jr.

District judges
Kevin P. O'Donnell 
Joseph Nash
Lewis Stoughton
Sue Elaine Haggerty
Kevin Flaherty
B.T. Fullerton
Amy Marcinkiewicz

State Senate
 Scott Hutchinson, Republican, Pennsylvania's 21st Senatorial District
 Elder Vogel, Republican, Pennsylvania's 47th Senatorial District

State House of Representatives
 Tim Bonner, Republican, Pennsylvania's 8th Representative District
 Aaron Bernstine, Republican, Pennsylvania's 10th Representative District at PA House
 Marci Mustello, Republican, Pennsylvania's 11th Representative District
 Stephenie Scialabba, Republican, Pennsylvania's 12th Representative District

United States House of Representatives
 Mike Kelly, Republican, Pennsylvania's 16th congressional district

United States Senate
John Fetterman, Democrat
Bob Casey, Democrat

Politics
Butler County has long been one of the most consistently Republican counties in Pennsylvania and the nation. The last Democratic presidential candidate to win it was Lyndon B. Johnson in 1964, when he won a national landslide and carried all but four counties in the state; indeed Johnson is the only Democratic presidential candidate to carry this county in over a century. In the 2000 U.S. presidential election, Republican George W. Bush received 62%, while Democrat Al Gore received 35%. In the 2004 U.S. presidential election, the county was carried by Republican George W. Bush 64% to Democrat John Kerry 35%. In the 2008 U.S. presidential election, the county was carried by Republican John McCain 63% to Democrat Barack Obama 35%. Since 2008, Butler County has continually given Republican nominees support in the mid-60s, with both Mitt Romney and Donald Trump receiving around 66% of the vote in 2012, 2016, and 2020.

As of November 7, 2022, there are 137,349 registered voters in Butler County.

 Republican: 77,650 (56.53%)
 Democratic: 40,372 (29.39%)
 Independent: 13,379 (9.74%)
 Third Party: 5,948 (4.33%)

Education

Colleges and universities
Butler County Community College's Homepage
Slippery Rock University of Pennsylvania's Homepage

Technical schools
Butler County Vo-Tech at bcvt.tec.pa.us

Public school districts
 Allegheny-Clarion Valley School District (part)
 Butler Area School District
 Freeport Area School District (part)
 Karns City Area School District
 Mars Area School District
 Moniteau School District
 Seneca Valley School District
 Slippery Rock Area School District
 South Butler County School District

Public Libraries 
The Butler County Federated Library System (additionally known as the Library System of Butler County) includes the ten listed libraries. Each library is managed by its own Board of Directors. The majority of the funding for these libraries comes from state grants, user fines and donations with additional financial contributions from Butler County. The first Butler library originated in 1894 with the Literary Society of Butler in what is now known as the Little Red Schoolhouse. The Butler Area Public Library, built in 1921, was the last Carnegie library built in Pennsylvania. In the intervening 27 years the library was independently operated. From 1921 to 1941 the library  quadrupled the number of patrons served. In 1987 the County Commissioners, through a resolution, founded the Butler County Federated Library System.

 Butler Area Public Library
 Chicora Community Library
 Cranberry Public Library
 Evans City Public Library
 Mars Area Public Library
 North Trails Public Library
 Prospect Community Library
 Slippery Rock Community Library
 South Butler Community Library
 Zelienople Area Public Library

Media
Butler Eagle daily newspaper
WBUT-AM
WISR-AM
WLER-FM

Recreation

Parks
There are two Pennsylvania state parks in Butler County.
Jennings Environmental Education Center is the home of the only protected relict prairie in Pennsylvania.
Moraine State Park The gently rolling hills, lush forests and sparkling waters disguise a land that has endured the effects of continental glaciers and massive mineral extraction. Each year over one million people visit the  park, yet never realize that many people helped restore the park from prior coal mining and oil and gas drilling practices. Today, the park is an outstanding example of environmental engineering achievement.  During the third great ice advance about 140,000 years ago, a continental glacier dammed area creeks making three glacial lakes. To the north, Slippery Rock Creek filled giant Lake Edmund. To the southeast, extinct McConnells Run filled tiny Lake Prouty. In the middle, Muddy Creek filled the medium-sized Lake Watts.

Before the glacier dam, Slippery Rock and Muddy creeks flowed north while extinct McConnells Run flowed south. The glacier dammed Lake Prouty on the edge of the drainage divide. Eventually Lake Pouty spilled over and rushed to the south, carving Slippery Rock Creek Gorge. Lakes Watts and Edmund drained into the gorge, digging it deeper and making Slippery Rock and Muddy creeks flow south.

The glacier created a landscape of rolling hills topped with hardwood trees and swamps in the valley bottoms. Moraines containing gravel, sand and clay were draped upon the landscape and silt was left on the extinct lake bottoms.
Reference to: http://www.dcnr.state.pa.us/stateParks/parks/moraine/moraine_history.aspx

Trails
Butler-Freeport Trail- The trail is a rail trail that connects the city of Butler with the borough of Freeport.
North Country Trail- The trail passes through Jennings Environmental Education Center and Moraine State Park, as well as several State Game Lands.
Washington's Trail- A regional scenic byway road trail that roughly follows the route George Washington and Christopher Gist took on the Venango Path from the Forks of the Ohio to Fort Le Boeuf in 1753.
There is also a trail in Slippery Rock Township that connects with McConnells Mill State Park in Lawrence County.

Transportation

Airports
Butler County Airport
Butler Farm Show Airport
Lakehill Airport

Major roads and highways

Transit
 Butler Transit Authority

Communities

Under Pennsylvania law, there are four types of incorporated municipalities: cities, boroughs, townships, and, in at most two cases, towns. The following cities, boroughs and townships are located in Butler County:

City
Butler (county seat)

Boroughs

Bruin
Callery
Cherry Valley
Chicora
Connoquenessing
East Butler
Eau Claire
Evans City
Fairview
Harmony
Harrisville
Karns City
Mars
Petrolia
Portersville
Prospect
Saxonburg
Seven Fields
Slippery Rock
Valencia
West Liberty
West Sunbury
Zelienople

Townships

Adams
Allegheny
Brady
Buffalo
Butler
Center
Cherry
Clay
Clearfield
Clinton
Concord
Connoquenessing
Cranberry
Donegal
Fairview
Forward
Franklin
Jackson
Jefferson
Lancaster
Marion
Mercer
Middlesex
Muddy Creek
Oakland
Parker
Penn
Slippery Rock
Summit
Venango
Washington
Winfield
Worth

Census-designated places
Census-designated places are geographical areas designated by the U.S. Census Bureau for the purposes of compiling demographic data. They are not actual jurisdictions under Pennsylvania law. Other unincorporated communities, such as villages, may be listed here as well.

Homeacre-Lyndora
Lake Arthur Estates
Meadowood
Meridian
Nixon
Oak Hills
Shanor-Northvue
Slippery Rock University
Unionville

Unincorporated communities
Several of these communities, most notably Renfrew, Lyndora, Herman, Sarver, Cabot, Boyers, and Forestville, have post offices and zip codes, but aren't officially incorporated under Pennsylvania law, and exist entirely within townships.

Boyers
Branchton
 Bredinville
Cabot
Eidenau
Fernway
 Forestville
Fox Run
 Glade Mills
 Greece City
Herman
Hilliards
 Hooker
Lyndora
Meridian
 Muddy Creek Flats
Murrinsville
Renfrew
Sarver
Unionville
Wahlville
Watters

Population ranking
The population ranking of the following table is based on the 2010 census of Butler County.

† county seat

In popular culture

Butler County has often been used as a setting for films shot in the North Pittsburgh area.  Such films include:
Night of the Living Dead (1968)
The Crazies (1973)
The Prince of Pennsylvania (1988)
Iron Maze (1991)
Kingpin (1996)
The Haunting Hour Volume One: Don't Think About It (2007)
Homecoming (2008)
Staunton Hill (2008)
The Road (2008)
I Am Number Four (2011) 
Death from Above (2011) 
The Avengers (2012) 
A Separate Life (2012) 
Foxcatcher (2013)
Films set in Butler County, but not necessarily filmed there.
Mrs. Soffel (1984)
Night of the Living Dead (1990)
Snow Angels (2008)
Novels set in Butler County.

Benjamin's Field, a trilogy by local author J. J. Knights

The Pennsic War, an annual medieval camping event by the Society for Creative Anachronism, is fought in Butler County.  Its site becomes the fourth most populous place in the county for a few weeks each year.

See also
 National Register of Historic Places listings in Butler County, Pennsylvania

References

External links

 Butler County official website

 
1800 establishments in Pennsylvania
Counties of Appalachia
Pittsburgh metropolitan area
Populated places established in 1800